The 2005 Coppa Italia Final was the final of the 2004–05 Coppa Italia, the 58th season of the top cup competition in Italian football. The match was played over two legs between Roma and Internazionale. This was the 12th Coppa Italia final played by Roma and the 8th by Inter. It was the first meeting of these two clubs in the finals. The first leg was played in Rome on 12 June 2005, in which Inter won 2–0. The second leg was played on 15 June 2006 in Milan and Inter won 1–0 to seal the trophy on an aggregate result of 3–0.

First leg

Second leg

References

2005
Coppa Italia Final 2005
Coppa Italia Final 2005
Coppa Italia Final
Coppa Italia Final